Stephanie Zhang (born 22 May 1985) is a Chinese-Australian figure skater. She is a two-time Australian national senior champion and a six-time national junior champion.

Personal life 
Zhang was born on 22 May 1985, in Harbin, China. She moved to Australia with her parents at the age of nine and was offered citizenship at age thirteen due to her talent.

Career 
Zhang began learning to skate at the age of four. In 2000, she won a bronze medal at the ISU Junior Grand Prix in China.

Making her senior international debut, she placed 10th at the 2001 Four Continents Championships. She also continued to appear on the junior level, placing 12th at the 2001 World Junior Championships and 7th at the 2002 World Junior Championships. She placed 25th at the 2002 Winter Olympics in Salt Lake City.

Zhang stopped competing after finishing off the podium at the 2005 Australian Championships. She made a brief return to competition in the 2012–13 season.

Programs

Results
JGP: Junior Grand Prix

References

External links
 

1985 births
Living people
Australian female single skaters
Figure skaters at the 2002 Winter Olympics
Olympic figure skaters of Australia
Figure skaters from Harbin
Competitors at the 2001 Goodwill Games